This is a list of all the rural districts, urban districts and municipal boroughs in England as they existed prior to the entry into force of the Local Government Act 1972 on 1 April 1974. There were 1086 such districts and boroughs at this time, the result of a gradual consolidation since their formation in 1894. Apart from these, England also had 79 county boroughs.

Bedford

Luton was a county borough.

Berkshire

Reading was a county borough.

Buckingham

There were no county boroughs.

Cambridgeshire and Isle of Ely

There were no county boroughs.

Cheshire

Birkenhead, Chester, Stockport, and Wallasey were county boroughs.

Cornwall

There were no county boroughs.

Cumberland

Carlisle was a county borough.

Derbyshire

Derby was a county borough.

Devon

Exeter, Plymouth and Torbay were county boroughs.

Dorset

Durham 

Darlington, Gateshead, Hartlepool, South Shields, Sunderland and Teesside were county boroughs.

East Suffolk

Ipswich was a county borough.

East Sussex

Brighton, Eastbourne and Hastings were county boroughs.

Essex

Southend-on-Sea was a county borough.

Gloucestershire

Bristol and Gloucester were county boroughs.

Hampshire

Bournemouth, Portsmouth and Southampton were county boroughs.

Herefordshire

There were no county boroughs.

Hertfordshire

There were no county boroughs.

Huntingdon and Peterborough

There were no county boroughs.

Isle of Wight

There were no county boroughs.

Kent

Canterbury was a county borough.

Lancashire

Barrow-in-Furness, Blackburn, Blackpool, Bolton, Bootle, Burnley, Bury, Liverpool, Manchester, Oldham, Preston, Rochdale, Salford, Southport, St Helens, Warrington and Wigan were county boroughs.

Leicestershire

Leicester was a county borough.

Lincolnshire, Parts of Holland

There were no county boroughs.

Lincolnshire, Parts of Kesteven

There were no county boroughs.

Lincolnshire, Parts of Lindsey

Grimsby and Lincoln were county boroughs.

Norfolk

Great Yarmouth and Norwich were county boroughs.

Northamptonshire

Northampton was a county borough.

Northumberland

Newcastle upon Tyne and Tynemouth were county boroughs.

Nottinghamshire

Nottingham was a county borough.

Oxford

Oxford was a county borough.

Rutland

There were no county boroughs.

Shropshire (Salop)

There were no county boroughs.

Somerset

Bath (and Bristol) were county boroughs.

Staffordshire

Burton upon Trent, Dudley, Stoke-on-Trent, Walsall, West Bromwich and Wolverhampton were county boroughs.

Surrey

There were no county boroughs.

Warwickshire

Coventry, Solihull and Birmingham were county boroughs.

West Suffolk

There were no county boroughs.

West Sussex

There were no county boroughs.

Westmorland

There were no county boroughs.

Wiltshire

There were no county boroughs.

Worcestershire

Warley and Worcester were county boroughs.

Yorkshire, East Riding

Kingston upon Hull and York were county boroughs.

Yorkshire, North Riding

York and Teesside were county boroughs.

Yorkshire, West Riding

Barnsley, Bradford, Dewsbury, Doncaster, Halifax, Huddersfield, Leeds, Rotherham, Sheffield, Wakefield and York were county boroughs.

See also
List of rural and urban districts in Wales
List of rural and urban districts in Northern Ireland
List of local government areas in Scotland 1930–75

References
Local Government Act 1972
The English Non-metropolitan Districts (Definition Order) 1972 (SI 2039/1972)
Charlwood and Horley Act 1974
Administrative history of Rutland, visionofbritain.org.uk 

 
 
 
1973 in England
Rural and urban districts
England